A Night in Paradise is a 1932 German musical film directed by Carl Lamac and starring Anny Ondra, Hermann Thimig and Ralph Arthur Roberts. A separate French-language version was also produced with the title Une nuit au paradis directed by Lamac and Pierre Billon. It was shot at the EFA Studios in Berlin. The film's art direction was by Otto Erdmann and Hans Sohnle.

Cast
 Anny Ondra as Monika Böhnicke
 Hermann Thimig as Gerd Brenken
 Ralph Arthur Roberts as Generaldirektor Walldorf
 Grete Natzler as Seine Frau
 Oscar Sabo as Böhnicke, Nachtportier
 Margarete Kupfer as Seine Frau
 Erna Morena as Inhaberin des Modesalons 'Marguerite'
 Henry Bender as Direktor d. Wohnungskunst A.G.
 Lewis Ruth Band as Orchester

References

Bibliography 
 
 Klaus, Ulrich J. Deutsche Tonfilme: Jahrgang 1932. Klaus-Archiv, 1988.

External links 
 

1932 films
1932 musical films
Films of the Weimar Republic
German musical films
1930s German-language films
Films directed by Karel Lamač
German multilingual films
German black-and-white films
1932 multilingual films
1930s German films
Films shot at Halensee Studios